Isani is a station of the Tbilisi metro on the Akhmeteli–Varketili Line.

The station opened in 1971 and was renovated in 2006.

External links
 Isani station page at Tbilisi Municipal Portal

Tbilisi Metro stations
Railway stations opened in 1971
1971 establishments in Georgia (country)